A Standard Goods locomotive is a steam locomotive used and often but not always designed for hauling goods trains.

Examples include:

 The 0-6-0 GWR Gooch Standard Goods class, also known as the Ariadne Class, serving on the Great Western Railway from 1852 until 1892
 The 0-6-0 Armstrong Standard Goods, serving on the Great Western Railway from 1866 until 1934
 The 2-8-0 New South Wales D50 class locomotive serving from 1896 until the early 1970s
 The 2-8-0 New South Wales D53 class locomotive serving from 1912 until the early 1970s
 The 2-8-0 New South Wales D55 class locomotive serving from 1918 until the late 1960s

External links
 http://users.nex.net.au/~reidgck/nswsteam.htm

Great Western Railway locomotives
Steam locomotives of New South Wales